Agave xylonacantha is a plant species native to Hidalgo, Tamaulipas, Guanajuato and Queretaro in Mexico, but commonly cultivated as an ornamental on other regions.  A. xylonacantha is an easy-to-grow member of the genus Agave. The specific epithet 'xylonacantha' means "wood spines".

Description
Agave xylonacantha produces a basal rosette of up to 180 cm (6 feet) in diameter. Leaves are sword-shaped, up to 90 cm (3 feet) long and 7.5 cm (3 inches) across, each ending in a spine about 4– 5 cm (1.6-2 inches) long. Margins of the leaves have spines up to 3 cm (1.2 inches) across. This gives the margins an undulating appearance. Flowering stalks can reach a height of 3.3 m (11 feet). Flowers are up to 3.5 cm (1.5 inches) in diameter with greenish tepals.

Cultivars include:

 'Frostbite': the leaf's edges are a creamy yellow
 'Blue': the leaves are blue-green

References

xylonacantha
Endemic flora of Mexico
Flora of Hidalgo (state)
Flora of Guanajuato
Flora of Querétaro
Flora of Tamaulipas